The 1977 Northern Iowa Panthers football team represented the University of Northern Iowa as a member of the North Central Conference (NCC) during the 1977 NCAA Division II football season. Led by 18th-year head coach Stan Sheriff, the Panthers compiled an overall record of 6–5 with a mark of 4–3 in conference play, tying for second place in the NCC. Northern Iowa played home games at UNI-Dome in Cedar Falls, Iowa.

Schedule

References 

Northern Iowa
Northern Iowa Panthers football seasons
Northern Iowa Panthers football